The 1974 Oklahoma State Cowboys football team represented Oklahoma State University in the Big Eight Conference during the 1974 NCAA Division I football season. In their second season under head coach Jim Stanley, the Cowboys compiled a 7–5 record (4–3 against conference opponents), finished in fourth place in the conference, and outscored opponents by a combined total of 262 to 183.

The team's statistical leaders included George Palmer with 516 rushing yards, Charlie Weatherbie with 622 passing yards, and Gerald Bain with 336 receiving yards.

The team played its home games at Lewis Field in Stillwater, Oklahoma.

Schedule

Roster
QB Charlie Weatherbie, Soph.

After the season

The 1975 NFL Draft was held on January 28–29, 1975. The following Cowboy was selected.

References

Oklahoma State
Oklahoma State Cowboys football seasons
Fiesta Bowl champion seasons
Oklahoma State Cowboys football